A number of steamships have been named Kinshasha, including:-

, a cargo ship in service 1922-25
, a cargo ship in service 1914-45 or later
, a Hansa A Type cargo ship in service 1946-50

Ship names